Qumranet, Inc. was an enterprise software company offering a desktop virtualization platform based on hosted desktops in Kernel-based Virtual Machines (KVM) on servers, linked with their SPICE protocol. The company was also the creator, maintainer and global sponsor of the KVM open source hypervisor.

History
The company was founded in 2005 by CEO Benny Schnaider, with Rami Tamir as president,  Moshe Bar as CTO, and chairman Dr. Giora Yaron. Qumranet had raised $20 million in two financing rounds from its founders, Norwest Venture Partners, Cisco Systems, and Sequoia Capital, in addition to investment by the founding partners.

The company's first product, named "Solid ICE", hosted Windows and Linux desktops on central servers located in a data center.

The Ra'anana-based company developed a virtualization technology for IT data centers.

From a very low-profile Israeli startup the company made waves with the rapid acceptance of KVM into the Linux kernel, and their Solid ICE desktop virtualization platform has received serious attention.

Avi Kivity was the lead developer and maintainer of the Kernel-based Virtual Machine project from mid-2006, that has been part of the Linux kernel since the 2.6.20 release in February 2007.

Qumranet was on the Gartner Group's 2008 list of "Cool Vendors," an award given to small companies with advanced technology.

On September 4, 2008, Qumranet was acquired by Red Hat, Inc. for $107 million.

Key executives
 Benny Schnaider, co-founder, chief executive officer and director
 Rami Tamir, Co-Founder, president and director
 Moshe Bar Ph.D., co-founder and chief technology officer	
 Giora Yaron Ph.D, co-founder and chairman of the board
 Shmil Levy, board member, Sequoia Capital  
 Vab Goel, board member, Norwest Venture Partners

References

External links
 http://www.qumranet.com/ (archived version)

Software companies established in 2005
Red Hat
Remote desktop
Software companies of Israel
Virtualization software
Israeli companies established in 2005